International Partnership for Human Rights (IPHR) is an international non-governmental human rights organization with its seat in Brussels, Belgium. It was established in the spring of 2008. It is a non-profit organization (NGO, registered with the Brussels Commercial Court as an association sans but lucratif, or (ASBL)).

Aims
IPHR's main aim is to empower local civil society groups promoting human rights in different countries and help them make their concerns heard at the international level. Working together with other human rights NGOs, IPHR acts to advance the rights of vulnerable communities, who are subject to discrimination and human rights abuses in different parts of the world, through monitoring, reporting, awareness-raising, capacity-building and national and international advocacy.

History
IPHR was created in the spring of 2008 by a team of human rights practitioners who had previously worked together for the Vienna-based International Helsinki Federation.

Activity
IPHR works together with human rights NGOs from different countries on project development and implementation, research and publication activities, as well as international advocacy (before the EU, Council of Europe, Organization for Security and Co-operation in Europe (OSCE), and United Nations). IPHR's cooperation with partner groups aims in particular at advancing the rights of vulnerable communities, such as  ethnic and religious minorities; pro-democracy campaigners, civil society activists, NGO members and others who are subject to persecution. IPHR also offers consultation services to other NGOs.

IPHR currently carries out activities in relation to Central Asia, Russia, Belarus and other countries of the former Soviet Union. Its work has also extended to other regions of the world, including the Persian Gulf countries and the Middle East.

IPHR is a member of several civil society networks, including the Anna Lindh Euro-Mediterranean Foundation for the Dialogue Between Cultures, the Human Rights and Democracy Network , the EU Fundamental Rights Platform , the Civic Solidarity Platform  and the EU-Russia Civil Society Forum .

Publications
IPHR has published numerous statements, appeals, briefing papers and reports. Most of these have been issued together with partner NGOs from different countries. They are all available at the IPHR website .

A few examples of joint publications include:
  Civil Society appeal: Placing human rights at the heart of EU action in Central Asia
  Fundamental freedoms under serious threat in Central Asia twenty years after Soviet collapse
  Internet censorship and control in Central Asia
  Contribution to OSCE Review Meeting: Civil society under pressure in Central Asian countries

Organisation
IPHR has three governing bodies: the General Meeting, the Board of Directors and the Director in charge of day-to-day management. The General Meeting is composed of all effective members. At least one meeting must be held annually to approve financial documents and appoint board members. The Board of Directors oversees the administration of the association and exercises all powers not expressly attributed to the General Meeting. It is composed of 3 to 9 members chosen among effective members; up to 1/3 of Board members may be outside directors.

Financing
IPHR finances its activities and projects through grants (from private and public donors, such as the European Commission) and fees.

References

External links
 International Partnership for Human Rights (IPHR) Official Site
 www.facebook.com/IPHRonline
 twitter.com/IPHR
 International Helsinki Federation for Human Rights
 EIDHR

Human rights organisations based in Belgium
Undesirable organizations in Russia